Yes Sir, Mr Bones is a 1951 American film written and directed by Ron Ormond and starring Gary Jackson.

Premise
A young boy finds himself in a home for retired minstrel acts. He's anxious to find out as much as he can about them, and flashbacks show what it was like back in the days of the minstrel shows.

References

External links

1951 films
American musical comedy films
1951 musical comedy films
Lippert Pictures films
American black-and-white films
1950s English-language films
1950s American films